Hatoum is a surname. Notable people with the surname include:

Ed Hatoum (born 1947), Canadian ice hockey player
Feras Hatoum, Lebanese journalist
Milton Hatoum (born 1952), Brazilian writer, translator, and academic
Mona Hatoum (born 1952), Lebanese artist